The 1995 Tendring District Council election was held on 4 May 1995. This was on the same day as other local elections across the United Kingdom.

Summary

Election result

Ward results

Alresford & Thorrington

Ardleigh

Beaumont & Thorpe

Bockings Elm

Bradfield, Wrabness & Wix

Brightlingsea East

Brightlingsea West

Elmstead

Frinton

Golf Green

Great & Little Oakley

Great Bentley

Great Bromley & Little Bromley

Harwich East

Harwich East Central

Harwich West

Harwich West Central

Haven

Holland & Kirby

Lawford & Manningtree

Little Clacton

Mistley

Ramsey & Parkeston

Rush Green

Southcliff

St. Bartholomew's

St. James

St. Johns

St. Mary's

St. Osyth & Point Clear

Tendring & Weeley

Walton

References

1995
1995 English local elections